The discography of the Japanese pop rock band Scandal consists of ten studio albums, twenty-seven singles, seven live albums, four compilation, two extended plays and three other video albums.

Albums

Studio albums

Compilation albums

Extended plays

Other album appearances

Singles 

Singles notes
 A Both certified gold for selling over 100,000 digital copies.
 B Certified platinum for selling over 250,000 digital copies.

Digital singles

Promotional singles

Other charted songs

Split singles

Videography

DVDs

Music videos

References

External links 
 Official discography 

Discographies of Japanese artists